Philadelphus microphyllus is a species of Philadelphus known by the common names littleleaf mock-orange or desert syringa. It is native to northern Mexico and the southwestern quadrant of the United States as far north as Wyoming, where it grows in scrub and brush habitat in foothills and mountains, often in very rocky areas, sometimes anchoring itself in rock cracks and crevices.

Description
Philadelphus microphyllus is a highly variable plant with many subspecies. Young branches are coated in stiff hairs, and older branches have reddish, yellowish, or gray shredding bark. They are oppositely arranged and deciduous.

The inflorescence is a solitary flower or cluster of two or three. The fragrant flower has four or five white or cream petals and a cluster of many stout stamens. The fruit is a hard capsule containing many seeds.

Cultivation
This flowering shrub, Philadelphus microphyllus, is propagated and used as a drought-tolerant ornamental plant in its native range for: traditional gardens; natural landscape, native plant, drought tolerant water conserving, and habitat gardens; and various types of municipal, commercial, and agency sustainable landscape and restoration projects.

See also
Philadelphus × lemoinei (an hybrid obtained crossing P. microphyllus and P. coronarius)

References

External links

 
 
 
 Jepson Manual Treatment — Philadelphus microphyllus

microphyllus
Flora of Northwestern Mexico
Flora of the Southwestern United States
Flora of California
Flora of New Mexico
Flora of Sonora
Flora of Texas
Flora of Wyoming
Flora of the California desert regions
Flora of the Rocky Mountains
Flora of the Sierra Nevada (United States)
Natural history of the California chaparral and woodlands
Natural history of the Mojave Desert
Natural history of the Peninsular Ranges
Garden plants of North America
Drought-tolerant plants
Bird food plants
Flora without expected TNC conservation status